Antonio Alonso Imaz (6 July 1938 – 20 July 2019), nicknamed Marquitos II, was a Spanish footballer who played as a defender.

Club career
Marquitos was born in Santander, Cantabria. He played for the Spanish clubs Plus Ultra, Cádiz and Abarán.

At the age 25, he moved to the Netherlands to join Excelsior Rotterdam in August 1963. In July 1964 moved to Blauw-Wit Amsterdam.

Personal life and death
Marquitos' brothers Marcos Alonso Imaz, José Alonso Imaz and Alfredo Alonso Imaz were also footballers.

His nephew, Marcos Alonso Peña, was also a footballer, and a coach. He represented, with success, Atlético Madrid, FC Barcelona and Spain – amongst others.

Marquitos died on 20 July 2019.

References

External links
 

1938 births
2019 deaths
Spanish footballers
Footballers from Santander, Spain
Association football defenders
Segunda División players
Racing de Santander players
Cádiz CF players
Expatriate footballers in the Netherlands
Eerste Divisie players
Excelsior Rotterdam players
Blauw-Wit Amsterdam players